Gold is a 2005 greatest hits collection by American shock rock band Kiss. This two-disc set covers the band's recordings from 1974 to 1982. All tracks are previously available.

Track listing

Personnel
Members
Paul Stanley - lead and backing vocals, rhythm guitar, lead guitar (Disc 1 track 9; Disc 2 tracks 15, 16, 18) first guitar solo (Disc 2 tracks 1, 4), bass guitar (Disc 2 tracks 5, 14) 12-string guitar (Disc 1 track 5; Disc 2 track 3)
Gene Simmons - lead and backing vocals, bass guitar, rhythm guitar (Disc 2 tracks 6, 12)
Peter Criss - drums, percussion, backing and lead vocals
Ace Frehley - lead guitar, backing and lead vocals, bass (Disc 1 tracks 7), acoustic guitar (Disc 1 track 9; Disc 2 tracks 3, 11, 16, 18), all guitars and bass (Disc 2 tracks 7, 11, 17)
Eric Carr - drums, percussion, backing vocals (Disc 2 tracks 18-20)

Additional personnel
Bill Bodine - bass guitar (Disc 2 track 13)
Steve Buslowe - bass guitar (Disc 2 track 10)
Lenny Castro - percussion (Disc 2 track 13)
Bill Cuomo - keyboards, synthesizer (Disc 2 track 13)
Sean Delaney - percussion (Disc 2 track 12)
Bob Ezrin - piano (Disc 1 track 19), orchestration (Disc 1 track 19; Disc 2 track 18), electric piano (Disc 2 track 18)
Dick Wagner - acoustic guitar (Disc 1 track 19)
Bruce Foster – acoustic piano and additional guitar (Disc 1 track 2)
Warren Dewey – fire engine sound effects (Disc 1 track 3)
Eddie Kramer - keyboards (Disc 2 tracks 4-6)
Anton Fig - drums (Disc 2 tracks 11, 14-17)
Richie Fontana - drums (Disc 2 track 10)
Tom Harper - bass guitar (Disc 2 track 16)
Neil Jason - bass guitar (Disc 2 track 12)
Michael Kamen - orchestration (Disc 2 track 18)
Holly Knight - keyboards (Disc 2 track 16)
Bob Kulick - lead guitar (Disc 2 tracks 10, 19-20)
Steve Lacy - guitar (Disc 2 track 12)
David Lasley - backing vocals (Disc 2 track 11)
Susan Collins - backing vocals (Disc 2 track 11)
Bobby McAdams – power mouth (talk box) (Disc 2 track 11)
Art Munson - guitar (Disc 2 track 13)
Stan Penridge - guitar, backing vocals (Disc 2 track 13)
Vini Poncia - keyboards and backing vocals (Disc 2 tracks 13-15, 17)
Joe Perry - guitar (Disc 2 track 12)
John Shane Howell - classical guitar (Disc 2 track 12)
Allen Schwartzberg - drums (Disc 2 track 12)
Bob Seger and Janis Ian – backing vocals (Disc 2 track 12)
Eric Troyer - piano, backing vocals (Disc 2 track 12)
The American Symphony Orchestra (Disc 2 track 18)

Kiss
Kiss (band) compilation albums
2005 greatest hits albums
Universal Music Group compilation albums